The Church of St John Aliturgetos is located in Nesebar, Bulgaria.

The church was not consecrated, hence the name - "aliturgetos" (αλειτούργητος) is the Greek for "not consecrated". The legend says that one of the builders fell down and was killed. The church canon did not allow a place where a man had been killed to be used for worship, but according to some records services were held in it. The church was badly damaged during the 1913 earthquake (Chirpansko earthquake). Its ruins in the southern part of the peninsula show that it must have been one of the most beautiful medieval churches in Nesebar. It is a domed cruciform church with three altar apses and a narthex. It is 18.5 m long and 10 m wide. The base of the cruciform part of the church is almost quadrangular, shaped by four columns. It has mixed masonry: stone and brick; the facade walls are segmented by blind two-step niches decorated with various geometrical patterns from bricks and stone cubes (ceramic plastic style). The church was built in the 14th century; it has two entrances, from the north and south, which is rare in the architecture of church buildings.

14th-century Eastern Orthodox church buildings
Churches in Nesebar
Medieval Bulgarian Orthodox church buildings
Byzantine architecture in Bulgaria